Cryptosaccus is a  genus of air-breathing land snails, terrestrial pulmonate gastropod mollusks in the family Hygromiidae, the hairy snails and their allies.

Species
Species within the genus Cryptosaccus include:
 Cryptosaccus asturiensis

References

 BioLib info here: 

 
Hygromiidae
Taxonomy articles created by Polbot